Friends på turné is the debut studio album by Swedish band Friends. It was released in 1999.

The songs "Vi behöver varann" and "Friends" charted on Svensktoppen.

Track listing

Charts

References

1999 debut albums
Friends (Swedish band) albums